Fanwood may refer to:

 Fanwood, New Jersey, a borough in Union County, New Jersey
 Fanwood, the codename for the Itanium 2 64-bit Intel microprocessor
 Fanwood (typeface), a FOSS version of Fairfield (typeface)